During the 1989–90 season, Red Star Belgrade participated in the 1989–90 Yugoslav First League, 1989–90 Yugoslav Cup and 1989–90 UEFA Cup.

Season summary
Red Star won their fifth double in this season. The season was marred by Dinamo–Red Star riot in the penultimate round of Yugoslav First League.

On 28 January 1990, Miodrag Belodedici made his Red Star debut in a friendly match against his former club Steaua București.

Squad

Results

Yugoslav First League

Yugoslav Cup

UEFA Cup

First round

Second round

Third round

See also
 List of Red Star Belgrade seasons

References

Red Star Belgrade seasons
Red Star
Red Star
Yugoslav football championship-winning seasons